Saint Judy is an American biographical drama film directed by Sean Hanish about Judy Wood, an immigration attorney who changed the law on granting asylum in the United States to save the lives of women. It stars Michelle Monaghan and Alfred Molina. Molina serves as an executive producer of the film.  The screenplay was written by a former intern of Wood. It premiered at the 2018 LA Film Festival. It was released on March 1, 2019, by Blue Fox Entertainment.

Plot
Saint Judy tells the story of Los Angeles immigration attorney Judy Wood, who single-handedly changed United States asylum law to include women to be a part of the protected class. Wood's victory is believed by immigration advocates to have saved the lives of tens of thousands of female immigrants around the world. The film starts from her move with her son from New Mexico to Los Angeles so her son can be closer to his dad, her work in an immigration law office, then in her own law office and in particular the case of an Asefa Ashwari, a teacher from Afghanistan facing deportation to her win in the 9th Circuit. It depicts her dedication to her clients over her family.

Cast
 Michelle Monaghan as Judy Wood
 Judith L. Wood as Herself (Cameo before credits)
 Leem Lubany as Asefa
 Common as Benjamin Adebayo
 Fahim Fazli as Taliban Leader 
 Peter Krause as Matthew
 Ben Schnetzer as Parker
 Waleed Zuaiter as Omar
 Mykelti Williamson as Dikembe Mustafa
 Gabriel Bateman as Alex Wood
 Aimee Garcia as Celi
 Kevin Chapman as Officer King
 Gil Birmingham as Michael Bowman
 Alfred Molina as Ray Hernandez
 Alfre Woodard as Judge Benton

Production
Principal photography began in May 2017 in Los Angeles.

Response

Box office
Saint Judy grossed $78,935 in the United States and Canada and $17,277 in other territories, for a worldwide total of $96,212.

Critical reception
On Metacritic, the film has a weighted average score of 51 out of 100, based on 7 critics, indicating "mixed or average reviews".

Festivals and awards
Saint Judy is nominated for an LA Muse award at the Los Angeles Film Festival 2018, Best International Film at London Raindance Film Festival 2018, and a Mind the Gap award at Mill Valley Film Festival 2018. Michelle Monaghan is nominated for Best Performance at London Raindance Film Festival 2018.

References

External links
 
 
 

Films shot in Los Angeles
Films shot in California
Films set in 2003
2018 films
American biographical drama films
2010s English-language films
2010s American films